Costulopsis skolix is a species of minute sea snail, a marine gastropod mollusc in the family Cerithiopsidae.

The species was described by Jay and Drivas in 2002.

References

 Cecalupo A. & Robba E. (2019). Costulopsis nom. nov., a replacement name for the Gastropoda genus Nanopsis Cecalupo & Robba, 2010 (Mollusca: Gastropoda: Cerithiopsidae), preoccupied by Nanopsis Henningsmoen, 1954 (Arthropoda: Ostracoda: Beyrichiidae). Bollettino Malacologico. 55(1): 65-67

External links
 Jay M. & Drivas J. (2002). The Cerithiopsidae (Gastropoda) of Reunion Island (Indian Ocean). Novapex. 3(1): 1-45

Gastropods described in 2002
Cerithiopsidae